Vereshchagino is a rural locality (a village) in Bryzgalovskoye Rural Settlement, Kameshkovsky District, Vladimir Oblast, Russia. The population was 144 as of 2010.

Geography 
Vereshchagino is located 7 km northeast of Kameshkovo (the district's administrative centre) by road. Novki is the nearest rural locality.

References 

Rural localities in Kameshkovsky District